KMAS (iFiberOne NewsRadio) 1030 AM & 103.3 FM is a radio station broadcasting a news/talk format, licensed to Shelton, Washington, United States.

On January 3, 2012, KMAS changed their format from oldies to news/talk.

On January 12, 2016, KMAS rebranded to iFiberOne NewsRadio as a result of merging with local cable/fiber optic provider iFIBER Communications.

References

External links

MAS (AM)
Radio stations established in 1962
Talk radio stations in the United States
Mason County, Washington